Ladimirevci is a village administratively located in the Town of Valpovo on the right bank of the Karašica river. One of the only two SOS children villages in Croatia is located here.

Etymology 
According to legend, the name Ladimirevci comes from the headstone at the entrance to the village, which has: "LAD I MIR EVICI" (shade and peace to Evica) written on it. But experts think that the Ladimirevci is named after the old name Ladimir because many villages in the area have names that end with "vci" suffix.

Famous people 
Fabijan Šovagović - famous theater and film actor

Literature 

Darko Grgić's "Ladimirevci: Drevno slavonsko selo" (1994).

External links 
Ladimirevci.info
Fabijan Šovagović
SOS Dječja sela

References
Arkod /preglednik

Slavonia
Populated places in Osijek-Baranja County